Crassula tecta is a species of succulent plant in the genus Crassula native to South Africa. Easily confused with Crassula namaquensis, this species has a compact growth habit forming clusters of round, blue-white leaves. Kept in cultivation since the 18th century, Crassula tecta is known for the beautiful patterning on its leaves and white flowers.

References

tecta
Plants described in 1778